Sorceress or The Sorceress may refer to:

 A female practitioner of supernatural magic

Film
 Sorceress (1982 film), a fantasy film directed by Jack Hill
 Sorceress (1995 film), a fantasy film directed by Jim Wynorski

Literature
 Sorceress (fantasy) or magician, a type of fictional character
 The Sorceress (play), an 1878 play by Abraham Goldfaden
 The Sorceress: The Secrets of the Immortal Nicholas Flamel, a 2009 novel by Michael Scott

Music
 The Sorceress (opera) or The Enchantress, an 1887 opera by Tchaikovsky
 Sorceress (Opeth album), 2016
 Sorceress (Jess Williamson album), 2020

Other uses
 The Sorceress (Waterhouse), a c. 1911 painting by John William Waterhouse
 A character class in the video game Diablo II
 A character class in the video game Dragon's Crown

See also
 Sorcerer (disambiguation)
 Sorcery (disambiguation)